"Halloween" is the seventh and final single by the American punk rock band Dead Kennedys, released on October 30, 1982. It appeared on the band's second album, Plastic Surgery Disasters, the following month. The song uses the practice of dressing up in Halloween costumes on Halloween as its subject matter in order to present themes of rejecting conformity.

In popular culture
The song was used in the 2022 slasher film Halloween Ends.

Charts

References

Dead Kennedys songs
1982 singles
Halloween songs
1982 songs